Stevenson is an English language patronymic surname meaning "son of Steven". Its first historical record is from pre-10th-century England. Another origin of the name is as a toponymic surname related to the place Stevenstone in Devon, England. There are variant spellings of the name, including Stephenson.

Notable people sharing this surname include:

Adonis Stevenson (born 1977), Canadian boxer
Alexander Campbell Stevenson (1802–1889), American politician and physician
Alexandra Stevenson (born 1980), American tennis player
Anne Stevenson (1933–2020), American-British poet
Anita Stevenson, English table tennis player
B. W. Stevenson (1949–1988), American country pop singer and musician
Ben Stevenson (disambiguation)
Cal Stevenson (born 1996), American baseball player
Carter L. Stevenson (1817–1888), American soldier
Charles Stevenson (disambiguation)
Coke Stevenson (1888–1975), American politician, Governor of Texas 1941–47
Collette Stevenson (born 1969), Scottish politician
Dani Stevenson (born 1980), American R&B singer
DeShawn Stevenson (born 1981), American basketball player
D. E. Stevenson (1892–1973), Scottish author
Eric Stevenson (disambiguation)
Fox Stevenson (born Stanley Stevenson Byrne, 1993), English music producer
Frank A. Stevenson (born 1970), Norwegian computer game developer and cryptographer
Gary E. Stevenson (born 1955), American religious leader
Harold Stevenson (1929–2018), American painter
Helen Stevenson (artist) (fl.1920–1935), Scottish artist and printmaker
Henry Stevenson (1867–1945), Scottish rugby player and cricketer
Hilda Stevenson (1893–1987), Australian philanthropist
Ian Stevenson (1918–2007), Canadian psychiatrist and reincarnation researcher
James Stevenson (died 1805), East India Company officer
Jane Stevenson (born 1959), British historian
Jane Stevenson (born 1971), British Member of Parliament elected 2019
Jessica Hynes (née Stevenson) (born 1972), English writer and actress
Jocelyn Stevenson, writer and producer
John Stevenson (disambiguation)
J. J. Stevenson (1831–1908), British architect of the late-Victorian era
Juliet Stevenson (born 1956), English actress
Katharine Lente Stevenson (1853–1919), American reformer, missionary, editor
Kimberly Stevenson, American businesswoman
Laura Stevenson (born 1984), American singer-songwriter
Leigh Stevenson (1895–1989), Canadian air marshal
Lewis Stevenson (disambiguation), a number of individuals with the name
Llanchie Stevenson, African-American ballet dancer
Marquez Stevenson (born 1998), American football player
Monica Lisa Stevenson (born 1967), American gospel musician
Morris Stevenson (1943–2014), Scottish footballer
Parker Stevenson (born 1952), U.S. television actor
Ray Stevenson (political activist) (1919–2004), Canadian writer and political activist
Ray Stevenson (born 1964), Northern Irish actor
Rhamondre Stevenson (born 1998), American football player
Robert Stevenson (disambiguation), a number of individuals with the name
Ronald Stevenson (1928–2015), Scottish composer
Ronald Stevenson (cricketer) (1938–1999), Scottish cricketer
Ryan Stevenson (disambiguation), a number of individuals with the name
Sarah Hackett Stevenson (1841–1909), American physician
Susan N. Stevenson, American diplomat
Savannah Stevenson (born 1983), English musical theatre actress
Stewart Stevenson (born 1946), Scottish politician
Teófilo Stevenson (born 1952), Cuban boxer
Thyra Stevenson (1944–2020), American politician
Toby Stevenson (athlete) (born 1976), American pole vaulter
Tom Stevenson (born 1951) British wine writer
Tommy Stevenson (1914–1944), jazz trumpet player
Trudy Stevenson (born 1944), Zimbabwean politician
Tyrique Stevenson (born 2000), American football player
Venetia Stevenson (1938–2022), English-American actress
Vernon K. Stevenson (1812–1884), American businessman
William Bennet Stevenson (c. 1787 – c. 1830), British explorer

Middle name:
James Stevenson Ewing (1835–1918), American lawyer and politician
Willie Stevenson Glanton (1922–2017), American politician

Extended families:
Stevenson family from Illinois
Adlai Stevenson I (1835–1914), U.S. Vice President
Adlai Stevenson II (1900–1965), American politician, governor of Illinois
Adlai Stevenson III (born 1930), U.S. Senator from Illinois
Lewis Stevenson (politician) (1868–1929), American politician from Illinois
McLean Stevenson (1929–1996), actor
 Scottish family of (mostly) lighthouse engineers
Alan Stevenson (1807–1865), lighthouse engineer
Charles Alexander Stevenson (1855–1950), lighthouse engineer
D. E. Stevenson (1892–1973), author
David Stevenson (engineer) (1815–1886), lighthouse engineer
David Alan Stevenson (1854–1938), lighthouse engineer
Robert Stevenson (civil engineer) (1772–1850), lighthouse engineer
Robert Alan Mowbray Stevenson (1847–1900), art critic
Robert Louis Stevenson (1850–1894), author of Treasure Island and The Strange Case of Dr. Jekyll and Mr. Hyde
Thomas Stevenson (1818–1887), lighthouse designer
 Scottish family with links to Tyneside
Flora Stevenson (1839–1905) education reformer
J. J. Stevenson (1831–1908), architect
James Cochran Stevenson (1825–1905) chemical manufacturer and Member of Parliament
Louisa Stevenson (1835–1908), campaigner for women's causes
Nathaniel Stevenson (1840–1811), General and Governor of Guernsey
James Stevenson-Hamilton (1867–1957), 16th of Fairolm and Kruger National Park ranger
Hilda Runciman (1869–1956), MP for St. Ives, 1928–1929

References

English-language surnames
Patronymic surnames
Surnames of English origin
Surnames from given names